Chrysotoxum fasciolatum is a species of holarctic hoverfly. The adults are strong mimics of wasps. Larvae of this genera, when known, are aphid predators.

Distribution
North America, Asia and Europe

Description
For terminology see Speight key to genera and glossary
The second antennal joint is longer than broad, and the third joint is two and a half to three times as long as the other two combined. Pteropleura with black pile.The lateral margins of tergites two to five alternating black and yellow, with arcuate abdominal bands interrupted and broader, less arcuate abdominal fasciae, with the front edge of the interrupted fasciae being almost parallel with the anterior margins of the segments. The wing microtrichia is well developed, and the wing vein R4+5 is clearly dipped into cell r4+5. There is no yellow spot above the fore coxa.

References

Insects described in 1776
Diptera of Europe
Diptera of North America
Hoverflies of North America
Syrphinae